Equine conformation evaluates a horse's bone structure, musculature, and its body proportions in relation to each other. Undesirable conformation can limit the ability to perform a specific task.  Although there are several faults with universal disadvantages, a horse's conformation is usually judged by what its intended use may be. Thus "form to function" is one of the first set of traits considered in judging conformation.  A horse with poor form for a Grand Prix show jumper could have excellent conformation for a World Champion cutting horse, or to be a champion draft horse. Every horse has good and bad points of its conformation and many horses (including Olympic caliber horses) excel even with conformation faults.

Conformation of the head and neck
The standard of the ideal head varies dramatically from breed to breed based on a mixture of the role the horse is bred for and what breeders, owners and enthusiasts find appealing. Breed standards frequently cite large eyes, a broad forehead and a dry head-to-neck connection as important to correctness about the head. Traditionally, the length of head as measured from poll to upper lip should be two-thirds the length of the neck topline (measured from poll to withers). Presumably, the construction of the horse's head influences its breathing, though there are few studies to support this. Historically, a width of 4 fingers or 7.2 cm was associated with an unrestricted airflow and greater endurance. However, a study in 2000 which compared the intermandibular width-to-size ratio of Thoroughbreds with their racing success showed this to be untrue. The relationship between head conformation and performance are not well understood, and an appealing head may be more a matter of marketability than performance.
Among mammals, morphology of the head often plays a role in temperature regulation. Many ungulates have a specialized network of blood vessels called the carotid rete, which keeps the brain cool while the body temperature rises during exercise. Horses lack a carotid rete and instead use their sinuses to cool blood around the brain. These factors suggest that the conformation of a horse's head influences its ability to regulate temperature.

Muzzle
A horse with a dished face or dished head has a muzzle with a concave profile on top, often further emphasized by slight bulging of forehead (jibbah). Dished heads are associated with Arabians and Arabian-influenced breeds, which excel at Endurance riding and were originally bred in the arid Arabian desert. There are several theories regarding the adaptive role of the dished head. It may be an adaptation to reduce airflow resistance and increase aerobic endurance. Dished head is not considered a deformity.
A Roman nose is a muzzle with a convex profile. Convex heads are associated with Draft horses, Baroque horse breeds and horses from cold regions.  This trait likely plays a role in warming air as it is inhaled, but may also influence aerobic capacity. Roman nose is not considered a deformity.

A horse with small nostrils or small nares can be found in any breed and often accompanies a narrow jaw and muzzle. Small nostrils limit the horse's ability to breathe hard while exerting itself. This especially affects horses in high-speed activities (polo, racing, eventing, steeplechase) or those that need to sustain effort over long duration (endurance, competitive trial, combined driving). Horses with small nostrils are therefore best used for pleasure riding or non-speed sports.

Eyes
A horse with pig eye has unusually small eyes. This is primarily an aesthetic issue, but claimed by some to be linked to stubbornness or nervousness, and thought to decrease the horse's visual field.

Jaw size
The lower jaw should be clearly defined. The space between the two sides of the jawbone should be wide, with room for the larynx and muscle attachments. The width should be 7.2 cm, about the width of a fist.
The jaw is called narrow if the width is less than 7.2 cm.
The jaw is called large if it is greater than 7.2 cm. A large jaw gives head a false appearance of being short and adds weight to the head. Too large of a jaw can cause a reduction to the horse's ability to flex at the poll to bring his head and neck into proper position for collection and to help balance.

Jaw position
A parrot mouth is an overbite, where the upper jaw extends further out than the lower jaw. This can affect the horse's ability to graze. Parrot mouth is common and can be managed with regular teeth floating by a veterinarian.
A monkey mouth, sow mouth, or bulldog mouth is an underbite, where the lower jaw extends further out than the upper jaw. This is less common than parrot mouth. This can affect the horse's ability to graze. Monkey mouth is common and can be managed with regular teeth floating by a veterinarian.

Ears
Ears should be proportional to the head. They should be set just below the level of the poll at the top of the head. Ears should be a position where they can be rotated forward and backward. Ears that are too large or too small may make the head seem too small or large in proportion with the body.

Neck length and position
A neck of ideal length is about one third of the horse's length, measured from poll to withers, with a length comparable to the length of the legs.
An ideally placed neck is called a horizontal neck. It is set on the chest neither too high nor too low, with its weight and balance aligned with the forward movement of the body. The horse is easy to supple, develop strength, and to control with hand and legs aids. Although relatively uncommon, it is usually seen in Thoroughbreds, American Quarter Horses, and some Warmbloods. Horizontal neck is advantageous to every sport, as the neck is flexible and works well for balancing.
A short neck is one that is less than one third the length of the horse. Short necks are common, and found in any breed. A short neck hinders the balancing ability of the horse, making it more prone to stumbling and clumsiness. A short neck also adds more weight on the forehand, reducing agility.

 A short, thick, and beefy neck with short upper curve is called a bull neck. The attachment to its body is beneath the half-way point down the length of shoulder. Bull neck is fairly common, especially in draft breeds, Quarter Horses, and Morgans. Bull neck makes it more difficult to maintain balance if the rider is large and heavy or out of balance, which causes the horse to fall onto its forehand. Without a rider, the horse usually balances well. A bull neck is desirable for draft or carriage horses, so as to provide comfort for the neck collar. The muscles of the neck also generate pulling power. A horse with bull neck is best for non-speed sports. Bull neck is not considered a deformity.
A long neck is one that is more than one third the length of the horse. Long necks are common, especially in Thoroughbreds, Saddlebreds, and Gaited Horses. A long neck may hinder the balancing ability of the horse, and the horse may fatigue more quickly as a result of the greater weight on its front end. The muscles of a long neck are more difficult to develop in size and strength. A long neck needs broad withers to support its weight. It is easier for a long necked horse to fall into the bend of an S-curve than to come through the bridle, which causes the horse to fall onto its inside shoulder. This makes it difficult for the rider to straighten. A horse with this trait is best used for jumping, speed sports without quick changes of direction, or for straight line riding such as trail riding.

Neck arch and musculature

A neck with an ideal arch is called an arched neck or turned-over neck. The crest is convex or arched with proportional development of all muscles. The line of the neck flows into that of the back, making for a good appearance and an efficient lever for maneuvering. The strength of the neck with proportional development of all muscles improves the swing of shoulder, elevates the shoulder and body, and aids the horse in engaging its hindquarters through activation of the back. An arched neck is desirable in a horse for any sport.

A ewe neck or upside-down neck bends upward instead of down in the normal arch. This fault is common and seen in any breed, especially in long-necked horses but mainly in the Arabian Horse and Thoroughbred. The fault may be caused by a horse who holds his neck high (stargazing). Stargazing makes it difficult for a rider to control the horse, who then braces on the bit and is hard-mouthed. A ewe neck is counter-productive to collection and proper transitions, as the horse only elevates its head and doesn't engage its hind end. The horse's loins and back may become sore. The sunken crest often fills if the horse is ridden correctly into its bridle. However, the horse's performance will be limited until proper muscling is developed.
 A swan neck is set at a high upward angle, with the upper curve arched, yet a dip remains in front of the withers and the muscles bulge on the underside. This is common, especially in Saddlebreds, Gaited horses, and Thoroughbreds. A swan neck makes it easy for a horse to lean on the bit and curl behind without lifting its back. It is often caused by incorrect work or false collection.
 A knife neck is a long, skinny neck with poor muscular development on both the top and bottom. It has the appearance of a straight crest without much substance below. A knife neck is relatively common in older horses of any breed. It is sometimes seen in young, green horses. It is usually associated with poor development of back, neck, abdominal and haunch muscles, allowing a horse to go in a strung-out frame with no collection and on its forehand. It is often rider-induced, and usually indicates lack of athletic ability. Knife neck can be improved through skillful riding and the careful use of side reins to develop more muscle and stability. A knife necked horse is best used for light pleasure riding until its strength is developed.

Crest
Large crests are relatively uncommon but can be found in any breed. It is most often seen in stallions, ponies, and draft breeds.  There may be a link to the animal being an easy keeper. An excessively large crest puts more weight on the forehand. A large crest is usually caused by large fat deposits above the nuchal ligament. An excessive crest due to obesity or insulin resistance can be treated with a reduced diet.

Conformation of the shoulder, forearm, and chest

The Shoulder

Straight, upright, or vertical shoulder
 The shoulder blade, measured from the top of the withers to the point of shoulder, lies in an upright position, particularly as it follows the scapular spine. Often accompanies low withers.
 Upright shoulders are common and seen in any breed. An upright shoulder affects all sports.
 The horse has shorter muscular attachments that thus have less ability to contract and lengthen. This shortens the stride length, which requires the horse to take more steps to cover ground, and thus causes a greater risk of injury to structures of front legs and hastened muscular fatigue.
 An upright shoulder may cause a rough, inelastic ride due to the high knee action. It increases concussion on front limbs, possibly promoting the development of DJD or navicular disease in hard-working horses. The stress of impact tends to stiffen the muscles of the shoulder, making the horse less supple with a reduced range of motion needed for long stride reach.
 An upright shoulder causes the shoulder joint to be open and set low over a short, steep arm bone, making it difficult for a horse to elevate its shoulders and fold its angles tightly, which is needed for good jumping, or in cutting. A horse with an upright shoulder usually does not have good form over fences.
 An upright shoulder is best for gaited or park showing, parade horses, and activities requiring a quick burst of speed, like roping or Quarter Horse racing.

Laid-back or sloping shoulder
 The horse has an oblique angle of shoulder (measured from the top of the withers to the point of shoulder) with the withers set well behind the elbow. Often accompanies a deep chest and high withers.
 A sloping shoulder is common. It mostly affects jumping, racing, cutting, reining, polo, eventing, and dressage.
 The horse has a long shoulder blade to which attached muscles effectively contract and so increase the extension and efficiency of stride. It distributes muscular attachments of the shoulder to the body over a large area, decreasing jar and preventing stiffening of the shoulders with impact. The horse has an elasticity and free swing of its shoulder, enabling extension of stride that is needed in dressage and jumping. A long stride contributes to stamina and assists in maintaining speed.
 The longer the bones of the shoulder blade and arm, the easier it is to fold legs and tuck over fences. The laid back scapula slides back to the horizontal as the horse lifts its front legs, increasing the horse's scope over fences.  
 A sloping shoulder has better shock-absorption and provides a comfortable ride because it sets the withers back, so a rider is not over the front legs.
 A sloping shoulder is most advantageous for jumping, dressage, eventing, cutting, polo, driving, racing, and endurance.

The humerus (a.k.a. the arm bone)

The arm bone is from the point of shoulder to the elbow, it is covered in heavy muscle and serves as a leverage point for the muscle of the front leg attached near the elbow.

"Ideal"

 The humerus should be very strong and shorter than the length of the shoulder, has many points of connections for muscle.
 It should connect with the shoulder in a ball and socket joint, this is the only joint in the front limb that is capable of side-to-side movement.
 The length can be determined by looking at the point of shoulder to the point of elbow.

Conformation of the Ideal Humerus (all measurements are while the horse is standing squarely)

 the angle of the shoulder blade and upper arm should be between 100-120 degrees
 instead of trying to visualize where the bones of the arm and shoulder are to get the above angle measured, the judge could use the angle between then point of shoulder and the humerus, which should be at the angle of around 85 degrees.
 long, well-sloped shoulder and short upright humerus
 the humerus is at desirable length when it is 50-60% the length of the shoulder

Faults

"Too long humerus"
 The humerus is considered too long when it is more than 60% the length of the scapula.
 When this fault occurs then the shoulder muscles become overstretched, and movement of the forearm is decreased.
 Because movement is constricted then the horse is more likely to be clumsy.
 too long = too horizontal which leads to the horse "standing under himself"
note "standing under" simply means that the horses legs are too far under his body and his chest sticks out.

"Short humerus"
 The humerus is considered too short when it is less than 50% the length of the shoulder.
 Humerus is usually in a horizontal position, which closes the shoulder angle (shoulder and humerus) to less than 90 degrees.
 With a short arm bone the horse will look like he has no chest at all and his legs will stick out too far in front of his body.
 Common, usually seen in Quarter Horses, Paints, and Warmbloods
 A short humerus decreases the scope of a horse, and contributes to a short, choppy stride.
 A short stride increases the impact stress on front legs, especially the feet. The rider is jarred and the horse absorbs a lot of concussion. More steps are needed to cover ground, increasing the chance of front-end lameness.
 The horse tends to be less able to do lateral movements.

note: that is the shoulder is too angled (less than 45 degrees) then the horse's front legs will be stilted and stiff.

The Elbow

 The highest point in the front leg, not covered in muscle.
 The part of the ulna that protrudes back to form the elbow, known as the olecranon process.
 Range of motion in the elbow is 55-60 degrees

Conformation

 Should not turn out or in and should sit squarely on the forearm.
 The olecranon process should be viewed in a vertical position from the rear.
 The elbow should be in line with the front of the withers and not farther back than the peak of the withers.
 Should blend in smoothly with the muscles of the forearm.

Possible faults

"Turned-in/tied-in elbow"

 Elbows are too close to the body and twist the leg.
 This conformation will make the horse toe-out.
 They tend to wing in when the knee is flexed.
 The feet may cross over, and they could stumble as a result.
 This also tends to be accompanied with a narrow chest.
 There is also restricted movement and this results in a shorter stride.

"Out-turned elbow"

 Usually associated with base-narrow and pigeon-toed conformation.
 The legs are too wide at the chest and too close at the feet.
 This makes the horse paddle out when they flex the knee.

The Forearm (radius)

 Connects the elbow and knee

Conformation

 Should be in perfect line with the knee and cannon (when viewed from the front or the side)
 Needs to be thick, wide, well-developed and long.
 Fused with the ulna.
 Minimal fat, muscles should be visible.
 The muscles of the front of the forearm are known as extensors and the back of the forearm  are known as flexors.
 The muscling of the forearm should be not bulky unless the breed is known for this; i.e. Quarter Horses and more so in the Draft breeds
 There should be an inverted "V" at the top of the chest.

Long forearm

 A long forearm is desirable, especially if the horse also has a short cannon. It increases leverage for maximum stride length and speed.
 Good muscling of a long forearm is especially advantageous to jumping horses, as the strong forearm muscles absorb concussion from the impact and diffuse the strain on tendons and joints on landing.
 A long forearm is best for speed events, jumping events, and long-distance trail riding.

Short forearm

 Although uncommon, it is usually seen in Morgans and Quarter Horses.
 A short forearm affects speed and jumping events, but has little effect on stock horse events.
 The length of stride is dependent on the forearm length and shoulder angle, so a short forearm causes horse to need to increase the number of steps to cover a distance, increasing overall muscular effort and hastening fatigue.
 Increases the action of the knees, giving an animated appearance. Knee action is not compatible with speed.

The Chest

The conformation of the horse's chest plays a significant role in his level of endurance and stamina. A horse that will do work requiring speed, power, or endurance needs as much room as possible for maximum lung expansion. The horse's ribs form the outer surface of the chest and define the appearance of the horse's midsection, or barrel, the area between the front legs and hindquarters.

The thorax of the horse is flatter from side to side, as compared to the human thorax, which is flatter from back to front. The horses thorax is also deeper from the breastbone to the spine. This gives the horse a greater lung capacity, and thus greater endurance.

Conformation
 A horse's chest is measured from the bottom end of the neck  to the tops of the front legs.
 Ribs play an important role in the shape of the chest, whether they are narrow or wide.
 The overall shape of a horse's chest plays a key role in the front leg movement.
 The horse's chest should be well defined and not blend into the neck.
 Width of the chest is measured from shoulder to shoulder, at the points of shoulders.
 Chest should be wide, with relatively wide gap between the front legs, but not too wide, as this may cause the horse to have decreased speed and agility.

Chest shape
When viewing the chest from the front, the chest should be wider at the bottom than at the top. The shoulder blades should be much closer together at their tops, toward their withers, than at the points of shoulders where the front legs attach.
 Most important thing to remember: The chest width allows for lung expansion and determines agility!

Well-sprung ribs
 Ribs that have a greater degree of curvature, have the "greater spring of rib."
 A horse with a well rounded rib is usually more endurance type (i.e. Arabian or Thoroughbred)

Slab-sided ribs
 Flat, short and upright rather than sloping backward.
 Ribs go straight down instead of outward and back, limiting room for lung expansion.
 Horses with slab-sided ribs tend to have less-developed abdominal muscles and less stamina.
 Also a longer, weaker loin, and can not carry as much weight.

Barrel chest and deep chest
 Most horsemen prefer a deep, wide chest over the barrel chest, as his length of leg tends to be greater than his depth of chest.
 Although, a horse with a barrel chest that has proper proportions can provide just as much lung room as a deep chest (in terms of actual efficiency and endurance)
 Barrel chest horses tend to have good stamina.

Chest faults
Narrow chest
 Too narrow in front with a narrow breast, and not enough room between his front shoulders.
 Narrow chested horses have a harder time carrying a riders weight.
 With a too narrow chest the forelegs may be too close together, or may angle out to be base wide.

Too-wide chest
 Too wide ribs hinder the backward sweep of the upper arm.
 Also spreads riders' legs apart uncomfortably and apply stress to the riders' knees.
 Too-wide chest cuts down on speed and agility

[All information is derived from "The horse Conformation Handbook" written by Heather Smith Thomas]

Narrow breast
 With the horse standing square, the width between the front legs is relatively narrow. However, this can be skewed by how far apart feet are placed at rest. A narrow breast often represents general thickness and development of shoulder.
 A narrow breast is usually seen in Gaited horses, Saddlebreds, Paso Finos, and Tennessee Walkers
 A horse's ability to carry weight is dependent on the size of its chest, so a horse that doesn't do well with draft work may be fine in harness or with a light rider.
 Narrowness may be from turned-in elbows which can cause toes to turn out, making the horse appear narrow.
 Narrowness in the chest may be from immaturity, poor body condition, inadequate nutrition, or under-developed breast muscles from a long time in pasture and lack of consistent work. The horse usually has undeveloped shoulder and neck muscles.
 The horse may tend to plait, and is more likely to interfere, especially at the trot
 The horse is best for pleasure riding, driving in harness, and trail riding.

Pigeon-breasted
 The front legs come too far back under the body, giving a bulky appearance to the breast as viewed from the side. The front legs lie behind a line drawn from the withers to the ground, setting the horse under himself. It is often associated with a long shoulder blade that drops the point of shoulder somewhat low with the arm bone relatively horizontal, setting the elbow more to the rear.
 A relatively uncommon fault, mostly seen in Quarter Horses with big, bulky muscles.
 Bulky breast muscles and legs set under the body decrease the efficiency of stride and swing of shoulders, thus hastening fatigue. It may interfere with the front legs, forcing them to move to the side rather than directly under horse. Causes a “rolling” gait that slows the horse's speed, especially at the gallop.
 Should have little interfering in the sprinting sports that need rapid acceleration. The inverted V of the pectorals are important for quick turns, dodges, and spins needed by stock horses.
 This conformation quality is most useful in Quarter Horse racing, barrel racing, roping, and stock horse sports where a low front end crouches & the horse makes quick turns.

Conformation of the body

Withers

Mutton withers
 The horse has flat and wide withers, from short spines projecting off the 8th-12th vertebrae.
 Can be seen in any breed.
 The withers are an important attachment for ligaments and muscles that extend head, neck, shoulder, and back vertebrae, and are also insertion point for muscles that open ribs for breathing. If mutton withered, the horse has less range of motion when extending the head and back muscles, so is less able to elevate its back with its head and neck extended, which affects ability for collection.
 Difficult to hold on saddle. If saddle slides forward, it can put weight on the forehand, interfering with balance and restrict the shoulder movement by saddle and rider movement, causing shortened stride, interfering or forging.
 The horse is often difficult to fit with a driving harness
 Pleasure riding and non-jumping activities are best for the horse

Hollow behind withers
 A “shelf” behind the withers, gives a hollow appearance, often created by lack of muscular development
 Usually found in high-withered horses of any breed
 Often implies a less-developed muscular bed for the saddle to rest on. The saddle will often bridge in this area to pinch the withers, creating soreness of the withers and muscles. The horse is then less willing to move out, extend the shoulders, or use its back, especially for speed or jumping. It also prevents a horse from true elevation of the back needed for collection. A poorly-fitting Saddle (with an insufficiently high pommel arch or a narrow tree) may initiate or exacerbate this condition, as the horse will avoid movements which cause discomfort, thus leading to muscle loss behind the withers.
 Horses that trot fast with high, erect neck (like Standardbred race horses) do not develop strong, active back muscles. They are often hollow behind and just below withers due to lack of collection.
 This conformation is commonly rider-induced from a horse allowed to move strung-out behind, and is usually seen in gaited horses and long-distance trail or endurance horses.
 Protective movement by the horse to minimize saddle pinching may contribute to back pain. Persistent body carriage without collection can overuse some musculoskeletal structure, leading to arthritis.
 This conformation will not affect performance if saddle fits correctly. If the saddle does not, the horse is best used for non-speed and non-jumping sports.

High withers 
 The 8th through 12th thoracic vertebrae are long and angle backward to create steep, high withers
 Especially seen in Thoroughbreds, Saddlebreds, and some Warmbloods
 High withers provide a lever for the muscles of the back and neck to work together efficiently. As the head and neck lower to extend, the back and loin muscles correspondingly shorten or lengthen. The backward angle of withers is usually associated with sloping shoulders, which provides good movement of the shoulder blade. This makes it easy for the horse to engage in collection, lengthen, round its back for jumping, or extend its shoulder for improved stride length and speed.
 If the withers are too high and narrow, there is a chance that a poorly fit saddle will impinge on withers and slip back too far, creating pain especially with the rider's weight. Performance and willingness will suffer.

Back

Long back 
 With the back measured from peak of withers to peak of croup, exceeds 1/3 of horse's overall body length. Usually associated with long, weak loins.
 Especially common in gaited horses, Saddlebreds, Thoroughbreds, and some Warmbloods.
 The horse's ability to engage back depends on its ability to elevate the back and loins, requiring strong back and abdominal muscles. A long back is flexible, but harder for horse to stiffen and straighten spine to develop speed or coil loins to collect and engage the hindquarters to thrust rear limbs forward. This then affects upper level dressage, cutting, reining, barrel racing, and polo: sports that require rapid engagement of the hindquarters. Reduced flexion forces the horse to jump flatter with less bascule.
 It is difficult to develop a long back's muscle strength, so a horse is more likely to fatigue under the rider and to sway over time. The abdominal have more difficulty in compensating, so they are also less likely to develop. Loins and hindquarters may swing more than normal, increasing the occurrence of sore muscles which leads to a stiff, rigid ride. Cross-firing or speedy cutting likely at high-speeds from a horse with a long back.
 Movement of the back is flatter and quieter, making a more comfortable ride and is easier for horse to change leads.

Short back 
 The horse's back measures less than 1/3 of overall length of horse from peak of withers to peak of croup
 Can be seen in any breed, especially in American Quarter Horses, Arabians, and some Warmbloods
 The back may lack flexibility and become stiff and rigid. If vertebral spines of back are excessively small, the horse may have difficulty bending and later develop spinal arthritis. This adversely affects dressage and jumping performance. If still in back and torso, the stride will become stiff and inelastic. The horse may overreach, forge, or scalp itself if the hind legs do not move straight.
 The horse may be handy and agile, able to change direction with ease. Good for polo, roping, cutting, reining. If the horse has good muscling, it is able to support weight of rider with rare occurrence of back pain.
 Conformation best used in agility sports

Saddle-, hollow-, low-, sway-backed/ down in the back  
 The span of the back dips noticeably in center, forming a concave contour between the withers and croup. Usually causes high head carriage and stiffness through the back. Associated with a long back.
 Often associated with weakness of ligaments of the back. Examples include a broodmare who had multiple foals and the back dips with age, an old horse where age is accompanied with weakening of the ligaments, a horse with poor fitness/conditioning that prevents adequate ligament support of the back muscles, or an overuse injury to the muscles and ligaments from excess work, great loads, or premature work on an immature horse.
 Some horses with high croups and straight backs often appear to be swayed.
 Often accompanies long loins. If the loins aren't broad, the ligament structures may weaken, causing the back to drop.
 A sway back positions the rider behind the center of gravity, interfering with balance. * The horse is unable to elevate for true collection, which can affect any sport but most notably dressage, jumping, and stock work. The back may get sore from lack of support and the rider's weight.
 The horse is unable to achieve rapid impulsion since the rear is less connected with front end. To achieve speed, the horse must create some rigidity in back and spine, which is not possible with a sway. This causes problems in racing, eventing, Steeplechasing, and polo.
 This horse is most suited for pleasure riding and for teaching students.
 Although sway backs are usually associated with older horses, there is also a congenital (sometimes genetic) form of sway back. Horses with this condition will already be obviously swaybacked at a young age, sometimes even before they are a year old.  Some lines of American Saddle Horse seem to carry this gene.

Loin and coupling

Roached back 
 In the area where the back and loins join the croup (the coupling) there is an upward convex curvature of the spine. Often a result of a short back, or injury or malalignment of the lumbar vertebrae.
 Often accompanied by less-developed loin muscles in breadth, substance, and strength. The spine already “fixed” in a curved position, and the attaching muscles are unable to contract properly to round or elevate the back. Thus it is difficult to engage the hindquarters or round the back by elevating loin muscles. Vertebrae often have reduced motion so the horse takes shorter steps behind.
 Jumping and dressage especially are affected.
 The horse is stiffer through the back and less flexible in an up and down motion as well as side to side.
 There may be back pain from vertebral impingement.
 There is a less elastic feel beneath rider as the back too rigid. Agility sports (polo, cutting, reining, barrel racing, gymkhana) are more difficult.
 Common fault

Long or weak loins/weak coupling 
 Coupling is the joining of back at the lumbosacral joint. Ideally, the L-S joint should be directly over the point of hip. Weak coupling is where the L-S joint is further to the rear. The loin is the area formed from last rib to point of hip. The loin is measured from the last rib to the point of hip, and it should be one to one and a half hands width. Long loins are associated with a long back. The croup is often relatively flat and the quarters are high.
 Horse with weak or slack loin might have good lateral bend, but collection suffers as true collection depends on coiling loin to bend the hind legs. Because the hind legs and hocks aren't able to be positioned under body, the hind legs string out behind, so the horse is more likely to go on the forehand. This creates coordination and balance problems, as well as forelimb lameness.
 The horse needs the hind legs under for jumping, and for going up and down hill. A weak loin inhibit's this, especially affecting eventing, jumping, and trail horses.
 The loin regulates the distribution of weight on the forehand by allowing the horse to elevate its back and distribute its weight to the hind end. Horses unable to coil the loins move with stiff backs and a flattened L-S joint, throwing the rear legs out behind. This limits the ability of dressage horses, and also affect reining, cutting, and polo horses as they are unable to explode with thrust.
Long-coupling is associated with a long back and short hindquarters.  This will limit collection is any discipline.

Short –coupling
 Also known as close coupled.
 Associated with a short back, which will enable high thrust and collection.

Rough coupling/widow's peak
 In the loin, the horse has a hollow area considerably lower than foremost part of the croup.
 Fairly uncommon, and does not affect the horse's use in sport.
 Cosmetically displeasing. Muscling of the loin may be ample and strong with minimal effect on ability to collect back or push with haunches. However, if a horse doesn't have a strong loin, it will have difficulty in raising the back for engagement.

Croup and "hip"
The croup is from the lumbosacral joint to the tail. The "hip" refers to the line running from the ilium (point of the hip) to the ischium (point of the buttock)of the pelvis. After the point that is made by the sacrum and lumbar vertebrae, the line following is referred to as the croup. While the two are linked in terms of length and musculature, the angle of the hip and croup do not necessarily correlate. But it is desirable for a horse to have a square to slightly pear shaped rump. A horse can have a relatively flat croup and a well-angled hip.  Racehorses do well with hip angles of 20-30 degrees, trotting horses with 35 degrees. Once a horse is developed, the croup should be approximately the same height as the withers. In some breeds a high croup is hereditary trait.

Steep Croup or Goose Rump
A steep croup is often linked to shortened stride
Less of a fault for slow-moving horses such as draft breeds than for light riding horses
Some breeds prefer a steep croup on their horses. Quarter horses in particular.

Flat or Horizontal Croup
 The topline continues in a relatively flat manner to the dock of tail rather than falling off at oblique angle at the hips.
 Seen especially in Saddlebreds, Arabians, and Gaited horses
 Encourages a long, flowing stride. This helps a horse go faster, especially when a flat croup is sufficiently long to allow a greater range of muscle contraction to move the bony levers of skeleton.

Short croup
Length from L-S joint to dock of the tail is insufficient for adequate muscular attachment
Reduces power of hindquarters
Usually seen in conjunction with multiple hind leg faults

Short "hip"
 The L-S joint is often behind the point of hips. Insufficient length from point of hip to point of buttock
 Horse will have difficulty collecting.
 A well-muscled build may hide a short pelvis.
 Provides less length of muscular attachments to the thigh and gaskin. This diminishes engine power in speed or jumping events.
 Short hip is less effective as a muscular lever for collection and to contract the abdominal muscles as the back rounds. More muscular effort is required.

Flat "hip"
Flat pelvis, line from point of hip to point of buttock flat and not properly angled, result is pelvis structure too long.  L-S joint often tipped, ischium improperly placed.
It is more difficult to engage the hindquarters, so the back tends to stiffen. Thus it is hard to excel in dressage, jumping, stock horse work. Minimizes the ability to develop power at slower paces needed by draft horses.

Jumper's Bump (also known as Hunter's or Racking Bump) 

The horse has an enlargement at the top of the croup, or a malalignment of the croup with the pelvis and lumbar vertebrae, caused by the tearing of a ligament at the top of the croup. One or both sides of L-S joint may be affected.
Fairly common, usually seen in jumping horses and in horses that rack in an inverted frame.
 It is a torn ligament caused by excessive hindquarter effort, or from a horse that had the hindquarters slip out underneath or trotted up a very steep hill. Usually does not cause problems once healed, although it is easier to re-injure.
 Usually associated with horses with weak loins or a long back that is unable to coil loins properly for collection. Commonly caused by overpacing young horses, a rider allowing a horse to jump while strung out, or by racking (or other gaiting) in a very inverted frame.

Tail

High Tail Set

	Tail comes out of body on a level with the top of the back.
	Commonly seen in Arabians, Saddlebreds, Morgans, and Gaited horses.
	There is no direct performance consequence. Often, although not always, it is associated with a flat croup. A high-set tail contributes to the appearance of a horizontal croup, which may be an aesthetic concern to some.
	Gives as animated appearance, which is good for parade, showing, or driving

Low Tail Set 

	Tail comes out of the body well down along the haunches. Associated with goose-rumped or steep pelvis.
	Seen in any breed, especially in draft breeds
	Only aesthetic concern unless directly caused by pelvic conformation.

Wry Tail/ Tail Carried to One Side

The tail is carried cocked to one side rather than parallel to the spine
May be hereditary
May be linked to spinal misalignment, possibly due to injury
May be because the horse is not straight between the rider's aids, can be used to determine how straight a horse is traveling behind. Over time, incorrect body carriage may place undue stress on limbs.
May be from discomfort, irritation or injury

Ribcage and flanks

Wide Chest and Barrel/Rib Cage

	Rounded ribs increase the dimensions of the chest, creating rounded, cylindrical or barrel shape to the rib cage. Length of the ribs tends to be short.
	Seen in any breed, especially American Quarter Horses, and some Warmbloods
	Provides ample room for the expansion of the lungs.
	Too much roundness increases the size of the barrel, may restrict upper arm movement, the length of stride, and thus speed. Round ribs with a short rib length further restrict the shoulder.
	Pushes the rider's legs further to the side of the body, and can be uncomfortable, especially in sports that require long hours in saddle or that require sensitive leg aids (dressage, cutting, reining).

Pear-Shaped Ribcage/Widens Toward Flank

	The horse is narrow at and behind the girth at midchest, then widens toward the flank
	Common, especially in Arabians, Saddlebreds, and Gaited horses
	Makes it difficult to hold the saddle in place without a breastplate or crupper, especially on uneven terrain, jumping, or low crouch work with quick changes of direction (cutting). When saddle continually shifts, the rider's balance is affected, and the horse and rider must make constant adjustments. Saddle slippage has the potential to create friction and rubs on back or cause sore back muscles.
	Horse is best used in sports on level terrain and for non-jumping activities

Well-Sprung Ribs

	Ribs angle backward with sufficient length, breadth, and spacing with arched rib cage and deep chest from front to back. Largest part of the barrel is just behind the girth area. Last rib is sprung outward and inclined to the rear, with the other ribs similar in length, roundness, and rearward direction.
	Desirable for any sport.
	Promotes strong air intake, improving performance and muscular efficiency
	Ample area of attachment of shoulder, leg and neck muscles, enabling a large range of motion for muscular contraction and speed of stride.
	The rider's weight is easily balanced and stabilized since the saddle stays steady and the rider can maintain close contact on horse's side with leg.
	There is sufficient room for developing strong loin muscles while still having short loin distance between last rib and point of hip (close coupling).

Slab-Sided

	Poor spring of the ribs due to flatness and vertical alignment of the ribs. Ribs are adequate in length.
	Common, especially in Thoroughbreds, Saddlebreds, Tennessee Walkers, and Gaited horses
	There is less room for the lungs to expand, limiting the efficiency of muscular metabolism with prolonged, arduous exercise
	If there is a short depth in the chest, the horse will have a limited lung capacity which is likely to limit the horse's ability for speed work
	Horse generally has lateral flexibility.
	Narrowness makes it difficult for the rider to apply aids since the legs often hangs down without fully closing on the horse. More effort needed to stay on horse's back because of limited leg contact and the saddle tends to shift.
	Horse has a harder time carrying the rider's weight because of reduced base of support by narrow back muscles.

Tucked Up/Herring-Gutted/Wasp-Waisted

	Waist beneath the flanks is angular, narrow, and tucked up with a limited development of abdominal muscles. Often associated with short rear ribs, or undernourished horses.
	Seen in any breed
	Often a result of how horse is trained and ridden. If a horse doesn't use its back to engage, they never develop their abdominal muscles. Appears to be like a lean runner (greyhoundish), with stringy muscles on topline and gaskin.
	Lack of abdominal development reduces overall strength of movement. Stamina is reduced, and the back is predisposed to injury. The horse is incapable of fluid, elastic stride, but is probably capable of ground-cover despite correct body carriage.
	Speed and jumping sports should be avoided until the muscles are developed.

Good Depth of Back

	The depth of the back is the vertical distance from lowest point of back to bottom of abdomen. Point in front of sheath or udder should be parallel to the ground and comparable in depth to front portion of chest just behind the elbow at the girth.
	Seen in any breed, especially Warmbloods, Quarter Horses, and Morgans.
	Good depth indicates strong abdominal muscles, which are important for strength and speed. Critical to dressage, jumping, and racing. Strong abdominals go with a strong back, which is suitable for carrying a rider's weight and engaging the haunches.
	Should not be confused with an obese horse in “show” condition, as fat just conceals wasp-waistedness.

Conformation of the hindquarters and hips
The Hindquarters

Short Hindquarters

	Measured from the point of hip to the point of buttock, the hindquarters should be ideally at least 30% of length of overall horse. Anything less is considered short. Most horses are between 29-33%; 33% is typically "Ideal," Thoroughbreds may have a length reaching 35%.
	Insufficient length minimizes the length of the muscles needed for powerful and rapid muscular contraction. Thus, its reduces speed over distance, stamina, sprint power, and staying ability.
	Tends to reduce the horse's ability to fully engage the hindquarters need for collection or to break in a sliding stop
	Horse is most suited for pleasure sports that don't require speed or power
       Often associated with too steep angles causing Goose Rump
       The point of croup is behind the point of hips, thus making a weaker loin and coupling
       May also cause horse to be sickle-hocked with the hind foot being too far under the body

Steep-Rumped

	Viewed form the side, the pelvis assumes a steep, downward slope.
	Uncommon, except in draft horses, but seen in some Warmbloods.
	A steep slant of the pelvis lowers the point of buttock bringing it closer to the ground & shortening the length of muscles from the point of buttock & the gaskin. Shortens the backward swing of the leg because of reduced extension & rotation of hip joint. A horse needs a good range of hip to get a good galloping speed and mechanical efficiency of hip and croup for power & thrust. Therefore, a goose-rumped horse is not good at flat racing or sprinting.
	Harder for a horse to “get under” and engage the hindquarters. Causes the loins and lower back to work harder, predisposing them to injury.
	A goose-rump is valuable in sports with rapid turns & spins (reining, cutting). The horse is able to generate power for short, slow steps (good for draft work).
	Horse is most suited for stock horse work, slow power events (draft in harness), low speed events (equitation, pleasure, trail)

Goose-Rumped

	Viewed from the side, the pelvis has a relatively flat, but sloping profile of adequate length, but the flatness does not extend to the dock of the tail as in a Flat-Crouped horse.
       The croup is exceptionally high and exhibits a sloping quarter and low tail connection, also with a sharp, sloping rump
       The pelvis is too far downward and too short
       Creates a low point of buttocks, making it closer to the ground, thus making the hindquarters less strong & inhibiting the stifle's movement
	Common in some Warmbloods and may be considered a desirable trait in some breeds.
       Often seen in Arabian breed due to the high tail placement; may exhibit levelness
	This conformation allows good engagement of the hindquarters, while giving the long stride and speed of Flat-Crouped conformation.
       A horse that is goose-rumped does not have enough swing and power in the hindlegs and would not be suitable for speed and endurance events
	Often associated with good jumping performance.
	Note that the term Goose-Rumped is sometimes used as a synonym for Steep-Rumped, potentially causing confusion, as the two conformations imply rather different qualities in the horse's performance.
       Horses with goose-rump also are more prone to hindquarter injuries
       Often associated with "Cat-Hammed" horses
       Does not severely affect draft breeds because of their short, slow steps

Cat-Hammed/Frog's Thighs
       The horse exhibits long, thin thighs and gaskins with insufficient muscling
	The horse has poor development in the hindquarters, especially the quadriceps and thighs. Associated with goosed-rumps & sickle hocks.
	Uncommon, most usually seen in Gaited horses. Can develop from years in confinement.
	The horse lacks the development needed for speed and power, so the horse is not fast or strong. Thus it is not advantageous for flat racing, polo, eventing, jumping, steeplechase, and harness racing.
	The horse's gait tends to be more ambling than driving at the trot, so the horse often develops a stiff torso & back, making the ride rigid.
       This fault can also be attributed to poor nutrition and conditioning

Thighs

       The thighs are the muscled area over the femur bone.
       The femur and tibia bones should be about the same lengths, thus allowing for more room for longer thigh muscles; this allows for greater speed and power and for a longer stride
       Thighs should be well-muscled, long and deep.
       The inner thighs should be full and give a square or oblong look to the hindquarters when viewed from the rear
       The back of the thighs or the "hams" should be thick enough that they touch each other until they split.

The Hips

Narrow Hips

	Viewed from the rear, the breadth between the hips is narrow.
       In horses with narrow hips, the pelvis is crowded and aligned improperly which puts more strain and stress on the joints of the legs
	Common, seen in any breed, although Quarter Horses tend not to have them. Usually in Thoroughbreds, Saddlebreds, Arabians, and Gaited horses.
	A narrow pelvis contributes to speed since the horse can get its hind legs well under its body to develop thrust.
	The narrow hip shape is partially dictated by exercise development of haunch muscles.
	Good width widens the breadth between stifles, hocks & lower legs to enable power, acceleration, & foot purchase into ground, preventing interference injuries. Narrow pelvis limits size of muscular attachments of hips, affecting strength & power.
	The horse is best suited for flat racing, trail, carriage driving; does not possess much driving power

Rafter Hips/Wide Hips

	Wide, flat hip shaped like a "T" when viewed from behind. Cattle tend to have this pelvis type to the extreme.
       The horse's legs are too far apart at the top and the feet are too close together; often exhibit base narrow stance (not straight from behind), thus exuding less amount of strength and placing more stress on the joints
	Uncommon, usually seen in Gaited horses, Saddlebreds, and Arabs.
	Rafter hips are often amplified by poor muscling along thighs and lower hips. Exercises to improve muscling helps the problem.
       Not desirable in a riding horse with fast gaits

One Hip Bone Lower/Knocked-Down Hip

	From behind, the point of hip on one side is lower than the other. May be due to an injury to the point of hip, or to subluxation or fracture of the pelvis.
	Uncommon
	Generally induced by a traumatic blow to hip. Not heritable.
	The gait symmetry is affected (which is bad for dressage or show horses). Interference with power and thrust may alter strength of jumping high fences or reduce speed.
       The horse may not be able to perform strenuous activities.
       Knocked-down hips interfere with speed and jumping.
	The horse is more prone to developing muscular or ligament soreness associated with re-injury or strain. This is especially likely to occur in a jumper, racer, steeplechaser, or eventer. However, in most cases the horse recovers completely, others will often still experience muscle soreness and will have to settle for only performing slow work.

High Stifles/ Short Hip

	Ideal hip forms equilateral triangle from point of buttock, point of hip, and stifle. A short hip has a short femur (thigh bone) that reduces the length of quadriceps and thigh muscles. The femur is short when the stifle seems high (sits above sheath in male horse)
	Found in any breed, but usually in racing Quarter Horses or Thoroughbreds.
	Effective in generating short, rapid, powerful strokes (sprint or draft work). The horse has a rapid thrust & thus rapid initiation of sprint speed.
	Ideally, the bones of the gaskin and femur should be of similar length in horse that does anything but sprint or draft work. A short femur reduces stride length behind & elasticity of stride that jumpers, dressage horses, and flat/harness racers want.

Low Stifle/ Long Hip

	A long hip is created by a long femur which drops the level of stifle to or below the sheath line on a male horse.
	Favorable in all sports except sprint sports and draft work
	Enables the horse to develop speed and power after it gets moving.
	The muscles of the hip, haunches, and thighs will be proportionately long with a long hipbone, giving the horse the capacity to develop speed and power over a sizeable distance. Produces ground-covering and efficient stride in all gaits.
	Good for eventing, steeplechase/timber, flat/harness racing, jumping, and long-distance riding

Conformation of the front and hind legs
The Cannon and Tendons

Long Cannon Bone 
 The cannon is long between the knee and fetlock, making the knees appear high relative to the overall balance of the horse
 Reduces the muscular pull of the tendons on the lower leg.
 Uneven terrain or unlevel foot balance will magnify the stress on the carpus since lengthy tendons are not as stabilizing to the lower limb as shorter ones
 Increases the weight on the end of the limb, contributing to less efficient and less stable movement. Added weight to front legs increases the muscular effort needed in picking up a limb, leading to hastened fatigue.
 Increase in tendon/ligament injury, especially when the horse is also tied-in above the knee.
 Horses with long cannons are best for flat racing short distances.

Short Cannon Bone
 Cannon is relatively short from fetlock to knee as compared to knee to elbow
 This conformation is desirable in any performance horse
 A short cannon bone improves the ease and power of the force generated by the muscles of a long forearm or gaskin. Enables an efficient pull of the tendons across the back of the knee or point of hock to move the limb forward and back.
 Also reduces the weight of the lower leg so less muscular effort is needed to move the limb, which contributes to speed, stamina, soundness, and jumping ability.

Rotated Cannon Bone 
 The cannon rotates to the outside of the knee so it appears twisted in its axis relative to knee. May still be correct and straight in alignment of joint, but more often associated with appearance of carpus valgus.
 Places excess strain on the inside of the knee and lower joints of the leg, potentially leading to soundness issues, although this is not common.

Bench or Offset Knees/ Offset Cannons
 The cannons are set to the outside of the knee so an imaginary plumb line does not fall through middle.
 Causes excessive strain on the lateral surfaces of the joints from the knee down and on the outside portions of the hoof.
 There is an exaggerated amount of weight supported by the medial splint bone, leading to splints.
 The horse is most suited for non-speed activities like pleasure riding, driving, and equitation.

Tied-in Below the Knee
 The cannon, just below the knee, appears “cut out” with a decreased tendon diameter. Rather than parallel with cannon, tendons are narrower than the circumference measured just above the fetlock.
 Affects speed event (racing, polo) and concussion events (steeplechase, jumping, eventing, endurance).
 Limits the strength of the flexor tendons that are needed to absorb the concussion and diffusion of impact through the legs, making the horse more prone to tendon injuries, especially at the midpoint of the cannon or just above.
 The leverage of muscle pull is decreased as the tendons pull against the back of knee rather than a straight line down back of leg. This reduces power and speed.
 Associated with a reduced size in the accessory carpal bone on back of knee over which the tendons pass. The small joints are prone to injury and don't provide adequate support for the column of leg while under weight-bearing stress.
 Horse is most suited for sports that shift the animal's weight to the rear or that don't depend on perfect forelimb conformation (dressage, driving, cutting).

The Front Legs- The Knee

Medial Carpal Deviation/ Carpus Valgus/ Knock-Kneed  
 One or both knees deviate inward toward each other, with the lower leg angles out, resulting in a toed-out stance. Occurs because of an unequal development of the growth plate of distal radius, with the outside growth plate growing faster than inside. The bottom of the forearm seems to incline inward.
 Any horse can inherit this, but it may also be acquired from imbalanced nutrition leading to developmental orthopedic disease (DOD) or a traumatic injury to growth plate.
 The horse is most suited for pleasure riding, low-impact, and low speed events * The medial supporting ligaments of the carpus will be under excess tension. May cause soundness problems in the carpals or supporting ligaments. Horse also tends to toe-out, causing those related problems.
 Some research is beginning to indicate that deviation of the front leg in this way will reduce the injuries to horses with sport use, especially racing, the research done in Thoroughbreds and Quarter Horses.

Bucked, Sprung, or Goat Knees/ Over at the Knee 
 Knee inclines forward, in front of a plumb line, when viewed from the side.
 Often a result of an injury to the check ligament or to the structures at the back of the knee. The column of the leg is weakened. Thus, the horse is apt to stumble and lose balance due to the reduced flexibility and from the knee joints that always are “sprung.”
 If congenital, often associated with poor muscle development on the front of the forearms, which limits speed and power.
 More stress is applied to the tendons, increasing the risk of bowed tendons. The angle of attachment of the DDF and check ligament is increased, predisposing the check ligament to strain. Tendons and fetlock are in an increased tension at all times, so the horse is predisposed to injury to the suspensory (desmitis) and sesamoid bones. If the pasterns are more upright there is further stress.

Calf-Kneed/Back at the Knee 
 The knee inclines backward, behind a straight plumb line dropped from the middle of the forearm to the fetlock.
 Usually leads to unsoundness in horses in speed sports. Places excess stress on the knee joint as it overextends at high speeds when loaded with weight. Backward angle causes compression fractures to the front surfaces of the carpals, and may cause ligament injury within knee. Worsens with muscle fatigue as the supporting muscles and ligaments lose their stabilizing function.
 Calf-knees weaken the mechanical efficiency of the forearm muscles as they pull across the back of the carpus, so a horse has less power and speed. The tendons and check ligament assume an excess load so the horse is at risk for strain. Often the carpals are small and can't diffuse the concussion of impact.
 The horse should have good shoeing, eliminating LTLH (long-toe, low-heel) syndrome.
 Sports that have more hindquarter function, like dressage, or slow moving activities like pleasure riding, are best for this horse.

The Front Legs- The Fetlock

Toed-Out/Lateral Deviation of Pastern from Fetlock/ Fetlock Valgus 
 An angular limb deformity that creates a toed-out appearance from the fetlock down.
 A fairly common fault
 Creates excess strain on one side of the hoof, pastern and fetlock, predisposing the horse to DJD, ringbone, foot soreness or bruising.
 The horse will tend to wing, possibly causing an interference injury. May damage splint or cannon bone.
 This conformation diminishes the push from rear legs, as symmetry and timing of the striding is altered with the rotated foot placement, particularity at the trot. Thus, stride efficiency is affected to slow the horse's gait.
 The horse is unable to sustain years of hard work.

Toed-In/Medial Deviation of Pastern/Fetlock Varus
 An angular limb deformity causing a pigeon toed appearance from the fetlock down, with the toe pointing in toward the opposite limb.
 Horse is most suited for pleasure riding, non-impact, low-speed, and non-pivoting work.
 These horses tend to paddle, creating excess motion and twisting of the joints with the hoof in the air. This is unappealing in show horse, wasteful energy, which reduces the efficiency of the stride, so the horse fatigues more quickly. The hoof initially impacts ground on inside wall, causing excess stress on the inside structures of the limb, leading to ringbone (DJD) and sole or heel bruising in inside of hoof.

The Hindlegs

Short Gaskin/Hocks High
 Results from a relatively short tibia with a long cannon. Ideally, hocks are slightly higher than the knees, with the point of hock level with the chestnut of the front leg. Hocks will be noticeably higher in horse with this conformation. * The horse may have a downhill balance with the croup higher than the withers.
 See especially in Thoroughbreds, racing Quarter Horses, and Gaited horses.
 With this conformation, the horse can pull the hind legs further under the body, so there is a longer hind end stride, but the animal may not move in synchrony with the front. This will create an inefficient gait, as the hind end is forced to slow down to let the front end catch up, or the horse may take high steps behind, giving a flashy, stiff hock and stifle look. May cause forging or overreaching.
 Often results in sickle hock conformation.

Long Gaskin/Low Hocks
 Long tibia with short cannons. Creates an appearance of squatting.
 Usually seen in Thoroughbreds and stock horses.
 A long gaskin causes the hocks and lower legs to go behind the body in a camped-out position. The leg must sickle to get it under the body to develop thrust, causing those related problems.
 The long lever arm reduces muscle efficiency to drive the limb forward. This makes it hard to engage the hindquarters. The rear limbs may not track up and the horse may have a reduced rear stride length, forcing the horse to take short steps.
 The horse is best used for galloping events, sprinting sports with rapid takeoff for short distance, or draft events.

Hocks Too Small
 Hock appears small relative to the breadth and size of adjacent bones. Same principals with knees too small.
 The joints are a fulcrum which tendons and muscles pass over for power and speed, and large joints absorb concussion and diffuse the load of the horse. Small joints are prone to DJD from concussion and instability, especially in events where the horse works off its hocks a lot.
 A small hock doesn't have a long tuber calcis (point of hock) over which the tendons pass to make a fulcrum. This limits the mechanical advantage to propel the horse at speed. The breadth of the gaskin also depends on hock size, and will be smaller.

Cut Out Under the Hock
 Front of the cannon, where it joins the hock, seems small and weak compared to the hock joint. In the front end, it is called “tied in at knee.”
 Mainly affects sports that depend on strong hocks (dressage, stock horse, jumping)
 Reduces the diameter of the hock and cannon, which weakens the strength and stability of the hocks. Means a hock is less able to support a twisting motion (pirouettes, roll backs, sudden stops, sudden turns). The horse is at greater risk for arthritis or injury in hock.

Camped Out Behind 
 Cannon and fetlock are “behind” the plumb line dropped from point of buttock. Associated with upright rear pasterns.
 Seen especially in Gaited horses, Morgans, and Thoroughbreds.
 Rear leg moves with greater swing before the hoof contacts the ground, which wastes energy, reduces stride efficiency, and increases osculation and vibrations felt in joints, tendons, ligaments, and hoof. May cause quarter cracks and arthritis.
 Difficult to bring the hocks and cannons under unless the horse makes a sickle hocked configuration. Thus, the trot is inhibited by long, overangulation of the legs and the horse trots with a flat stride with the legs strung out behind.
 It is difficult to engage the back or haunches, so it is hard to do upper level dressage movements, bascule over jumps, or gallop efficiently.

Sickle- or Sabre-Hocked/ Overangulated Long Hind Legs 
 The hind leg slants forward, in front of the plumb line, when viewed from the side. The cannon is unable to be put in vertical position. Also called “curby” hock, as it is associated with soft tissue injury in the rear, lower part of the hock.
 Limits the straightening and backward extension of hocks, which this limits push-off, propulsion, and speed. There is overall more hock and stifle stress.
 Closed angulation and loading on the back of the hock predisposes the horse to bone and bog spavin, thoroughpin, and curb.

Post-Legged/Straight Behind
 Angles of the hock and stifle are open. The tibia is fairly vertical, rather than having a more normal 60 degree slope
 Common, usually seen in Thoroughbreds, steeplechasers, timber horses, eventers, and hunter/jumpers.
 In theory, sickle hocks facilitate forward and rearward reach as the hock opens and closes with a full range of motion without the hock bones impinging on one another. This led to selective breeding of speed horses with straight rear legs, especially long gaskins.
 The problem is that this breeding has been taken to the extreme. Tension on the hock irritates the joint capsule and cartilage, leading to bog and bone spavin. Restriction of the tarsal sheath while in motion leads to thoroughpin. A straight stifle limits the ligaments across the patella, predisposing the horse to upward fixation of the patella, with the stifle in a locked position, which interferes with performance and can lead to arthritis of the stifle.
 It is difficult for the horse to use its lower back, reducing the power and swing of the leg.
 Rapid thrust of the rear limbs causes the feet to stab into the ground, leading to bruises and quarter cracks.

Bow-Legged/Wobbly Hocks
 Hocks deviate from each other to fall outside of plumb line, dropped from point of buttocks, when the horse is viewed from behind.
 Most commonly seen in Quarter Horses with a bulldog stance.
 Hoof swings in as the horse picks up its hocks and then rotates out, predisposing the animal to interference and causing excess stress on lateral hock structures, predisposing the horse to bog and bone spavin, and thoroughpin.
 The twisting motion of the hocks causes a screwing motion on the hoof as it hits the ground, leading to bruises, corns, quarter cracks, and ringbone.
 The horse does not reach forward as well with the hind legs because of the twisting motion of the hocks once lifted, and the legs may not clear the abdomen if the stifles are directed more forward than normal. This reduces efficiency for speed and power.

Cow Hocks/Medial Deviation of the Hocks/Tarsus Valgus
 Hocks deviate toward each other, with the cannon and fetlock to the outside of the hocks when the horse is viewed from the side. Gives the appearance of a half-moon contour from the stifle to hoof. Often accompanied by sickle hocks.
 Fairly common, usually seen in draft breeds.
 Disadvantages to trotting horses, harness racers, jumpers, speed events, and stock horses.
 Many times Arabians, Trakehners, and horses of Arabian descent are thought to have cow hocks. But really the fetlocks are in alignment beneath the hocks, so they're not true cow hocks.
 A slight inward turning of hocks is not considered a defect and should have no effect.
 A horse with a very round barrel will be forced to turn the stifles more out, giving a cow-hocked appearance
 Medial deviation in true cow hocks causes strain on the inside of the hock joint, predisposing the horse to bone spavin. Abnormal twisting of pastern and cannon predisposes fetlocks to injury.
 More weight is carried on medial part of hoof, so it is more likely to cause bruising, quarter cracks, and corns. The lower legs twist beneath the hocks, causing interfering.
 The horse develops relatively weak thrust, so speed usually suffers.

Conformation of the pasterns
The angle of the pasterns is best at a moderate slope (between 50-55 degrees) and moderate length.

Pasterns Long and Sloping 
	The pasterns are long (more than 3/4 length of cannon) relative to rest of leg.
	This defect affects long-distance and speed sports
	Long pasterns have been favored because they can diffuse impact, giving a more comfortable ride. However, excess length puts extreme tension on the tendons and ligaments of the back of the leg, predisposing the horse to a bowed tendon or suspensory ligament injury. The suspensory is strained because fetlock is unable to straighten as horse loads the limb with weight.
	The pasterns are weak and unable to stabilize fetlock drop, so the horse is predisposed to ankle injuries, especially in speed events where the sesamoids are under extreme pressure from the pull of the suspensory. This can cause sesamoid fractures & breakdown injuries.
	May be associated with high or low ringbone. Increased drop of fetlock causes more stress on pastern and coffin joints, setting up conditions for arthritis.
	There is a delay time to get the feet off the ground to accelerate, and thus long pasterns make the horse poor for speed events.
	The horse is best for pleasuring riding, equitation, and dressage

Pasterns Short and Upright 
	A horse's pasterns are short if they are less than 1/2 length of cannon. The pasterns are upright if they are angled more toward the vertical. A long, upright pastern has the same performance consequences as short and upright.
	Most commonly seen in Quarter Horses, Paints, and Warmbloods
	The horse is capable of rapid acceleration, but is restricted to a short stride. They excel in sprint sports. The short stride is a result of both a short pastern and upright shoulder, creating a short, choppy stride with minimal elasticity and limited speed.
	Short pasterns have less shock-absorption, leading to more a jarring ride and amplified stress on the lower leg. The concussion is felt over the navicular apparatus, so the horse is more at risk for navicular disease, high or low ringbone, and sidebone. Also windpuffs and windgalls occur from chronic irritation within fetlock or flexor tendon sheath.
	The horse has reduced mechanical efficiency for lifting and breaking over the toe, so it may trip or stumble.
	The horse is best for sprint sports like Quarter Horse racing, barrel racing, roping, reining, and cutting

Conformation of the feet and base

The hooves bear all the weight of the horse. As each foot hits the ground, a concussive force passes through the foot up to the leg. The complex structure of the hoof is designed to absorb this impact, preventing injury. The internal hoof structure also aids circulation. When a horse is ridden, the weight of the rider adds to the force absorbed by the legs and feet. Poor conformation of the feet may lead to uneven or ineffective distribution of these impacts, in some cases increasing the risk of injury. Therefore, the hoof conformation is important to soundness.

Toe-Out/Splay Footed
	The horse's feet are turned away from each other
	Common fault
	Causes winging motion that may lead to interfering injury around fetlock or splint.
	As horse wings inward, there is a chance that he may step on himself, stumble, and fall.
	A horse that is “tied in behind the elbow” has restricted movement of the upper arm because there is less clearance for the humerus (it angles into the body too much). Reduced clearance of legs causes horse to toe-out to compensate.

Toe-In, Pigeon-Toed
	Toes of hooves face in toward each other
	Common fault
	Pigeon-toes cause excess strain on the outside of the lower structures of the limb as the horse hits hard on the outside hoof wall. This often leads to high or low ringbone. The horse is also predisposed to sidebone and sole bruising.
	The horse moves with a paddling motion, wasting energy and hastening fatigue so that he has less stamina.

Base Narrow in Front: Toed-Out or Toed-In
	The feet are closer together and more under the body than the shoulders
	Fairly common fault
	Base-narrow, toed-out: Stresses the outside structures of the limb, especially the outside of the foot. Causes a winging motion, leading to interfering. Predisposes the horse to plaiting. The horse tends to hit himself more when fatigued.
	Base narrow, toed-in: Excessive strain on the lateral structures of fetlock, pastern, and outside of hoof wall. Causes the horse to paddle.
	The horse is least suited for speed or agility sports.

Base Wide in Front: Toed-In or Toed-Out
	The horse stands with its feet placed wider at the shoulders, often associated with a narrow chest.
	Uncommon fault
	Base wide, toed-out: the horse lands hard on the outside of the hoof wall and places excessive strain on the medial structures of the fetlock and pastern, leading to ringbone or sidebone, & potentially spraining structures of the carpus. The horse will wing in, possibly leading to an interference injury or overload injury of the splint bone.
	Base wide, toed-in: the horse lands hard on the inside hoof wall, placing stress on the medial structures of limb. The horse will also paddle.

Stands Close Behind/Base Narrow Behind
	With a plumb line from the point of buttock, the lower legs & feet are placed more toward the midline than the regions of hips & thigh, with a plumb line falling to the outside of the lower leg from the hock downward. Usually accompanied by bow-legged conformation.
	A fairly common fault, especially in heavily muscled horses like Quarter Horses.
	The hooves tend to wing in, so the horse is more likely to interfere. If the hocks touch, they may also interfere.
	The horse can't develop speed for rapid acceleration.
	The outside of the hocks, fetlocks, & hooves receive excessive stress & pressure. This leads to DJD, ligament strain, hoof bruising, & quarter cracks.
	The horse is best for non-speed sports & those that don't require spins, dodges, or tight turns

The Hoof

Feet Too Small  
	Relative to size and body mass, the feet are proportionately small
	There is a propensity to breed for small feet in Thoroughbreds, Saddlebreds, and American Quarter Horses.
	A small foot is less capable of diffusing impact stress with each footfall than a larger one.
	On hard footing, the foot itself receives extra concussion. Over time, this can lead to sole bruising, laminitis, heel soreness, navicular disease, and ringbone. Sore-footed horses take short, choppy strides, so they have a rough ride and no gait efficiency.
	If the horse has good shoeing support, it can comfortably participate in any sport, although it is more likely to stay sound in sports that involve soft footing.

Feet Large and Flat/ Mushroom-Footed 
	Large in width & breadth relative to body size & mass. May have slight pastern bones relative to large coffin bone.
	Flat feet limit the soundness of the horse in concussion sports (jumping, eventing, steeplechase, distance riding).
	Without proper shoeing or support, the sole may flatten. Low, flat soles are predisposed to laminitis or bruising. The horse takes on a choppy, short stride. It is hard for the horse to walk on rocky or rugged footing without extra protection on the hoof.
	A large foot with good cup to sole is ideal foot for any horse. There is less incidence of lameness, and it is associated with good bone.
	For flat footed horses, sports with soft footing and short distances like dressage, equitation, flat racing, barrel racing are best.

Mule Feet
	Horse has a narrow, oval foot with steep walls
	Mule feet are fairly common, usually seen in American Quarter Horses, Arabians, Saddlebreds, Tennessee Walkers, Foxtrotters, and Mules
	A mule foot provides little shock absorption to foot & limb, creating issues like sole bruising, corns, laminitis, navicular, sidebone, and ringbone. Not all horses have soundness issues, especially if they are light on the front end & have very tough horn.
	Because the hind end provides propulsion, it is normal to see more narrower hooves on back compared to front
	Soft-terrain sports like polo, dressage, arena work (equitation, reining, cutting), and pleasure riding are most suitable

Coon-Footed 
	The slope of hoof wall is steeper than the pastern, often associated with long, sloping pasterns tending to the horizontal, which breaks the angulation between pastern and hoof. Usually seen in rear feet, esp in post-legged horses. Coon feet are sometimes due to a weak suspensory that allows the fetlock to drop.
	Quite uncommon, it particularly affects speed sports and agility sports
	Coon feet create similar problems as too long & sloping pasterns (the horse prone to run-down injuries on back of fetlock). If foot lift off is delayed in bad footing, ligament and tendon strain & injury to the sesamoid bones is likely.
	Weakness to supporting ligaments due to post leg or injury to suspensory will result in a coon-foot as the fetlock drops.
	The horse is most suited for low-speed exercise like pleasure riding or equitation

Club Foot  
	The slope of the front face of hoof exceeds 60 degrees. Horse often has long, upright heels. May be from contracture of DDF (deep digital flexor tendon) that was not addressed at birth or developed from nutritional imbalances or trauma.
	Fairly common, best to use horse in activities done in soft-footing & those that depend on strong hindquarter usage
	Various degrees of angulation, from slight to very pronounced. Horses with obvious club feet land more on the toes, causing toe bruising or laminitis. The horse generally does poorly at prolonged exercise, especially if on hard or uneven terrain (eventing, trail riding).
	Because the toe is easily bruised, the horse moves with a short, choppy stride, and may stumble. The horse is a poor jumping prospect due to trauma incurred on impact of landing.

Contracted Heels 
	The heels appear narrow and the sulci of frogs are deep while the frog may be atrophied
	May be seen in any breed, but most common in American Quarter Horses, Thoroughbreds, Saddlebreds, Tennessee Walkers, or Gaited horses
	Contracted heels are not normally inherited, but a symptom of limb unsoundness. A horse in pain will protect the limb by landing more softly on it. Over time, the structures contract. The source of pain should be explored by a vet.
	Contracted heels create problems like thrush. The horse loses shock absorption ability, potentially contributing to the development of navicular syndrome, sole bruising, laminitis, and corns. Heel expansibility may also be restricted, causing lameness from pressure around the coffin bone and reduced elasticity of the digital cushion.
	Horse is best used for non-concussion sports.

Thin Walls
	Wall is narrow and thin when viewed from bottom. Often associated with flat feet or too small feet.
	Common, especially in American Quarter Horses, Thoroughbreds, and Saddlebreds.
	Thin walls reduce the weight-bearing base of support, and are often accompanied by flat or tender soles that easily bruise. The horse is subject to developing corns at the angles of the bar. The horse tends to grow long-toes with low heels, moving the hoof tubules in horizontal direction, and so it reduces shock absorption ability and increases the risk of lameness.
	Less integrity for expansion and flexion of hoof, making it more brittle and prone to sand & quarter cracks. Narrow white line makes it hard to hold shoes on.
	Horse does best when worked only on soft footing.

Flared Hoof Wall 
	One side of the hoof flares towards its bottom, relative to the steep appearance of the other side. Flared surface is concave.
	Horse is best to use in low-impact or low-speed sports
	May be conformationally induced from angular limb deformity or malalignments of the bones within the hoof. These conformational problems cause excess strain on one side of hoof making it steepen, while the side with less impact grows to a flare. The coronary band often slopes asymmetrically due to pushing of hoof wall & coronet on steep side, which gets more impact than flared. May develop sheared heels, causing lameness issues, contracted heels & thrush.
	May be acquired from imbalanced trimming methods over time that stimulate more stress on one side of foot.
	Chronic lameness may make the horse load the limb unevenly, even if the lameness may be in hock or stifle.

Overall balance and bone
Insufficient Bone
 Measuring the circumference of the top of the cannon bone, just below the knee, gives an estimation of the substance. Ideally a 1,000 lb horse should have 7-8 inches. Insufficient is less than 7 inches for every 1,000 lb of weight.
 A horse with insufficient bone is more at risk for injury (within the bones, joints, muscle, tendons, ligaments, and feet).
 Repeated impact creates soundness issues, especially in those sports with a lot of concussion (jumping, galloping, racing, long-distance trail). Track horses get bucked shins, event and trail horses get strained tendons and ligaments.

Light-Framed/Fine Boned 
 Substance of long bones is slight and thin relative to the size & mass of the horse. Especially noticed in the area of the cannon & pastern.
 Seen especially in show horses, halter horses in non-performance work, Paso Finos, Gaited horses, and Thoroughbreds.
 Affects the longevity of hard-working performance horses.
 See “insufficient bone.” Doesn't provide ample support for bulky musculature & there is a lack of harmony visually.
 Theoretically, a lighter frame reduces the weight on the end of the limbs, making it easier to pick up the legs & move freely across the ground. However, with a lot of speed & impact work, light bone suffers concussion injury, leading to bucked shins, splints, & stress fractures. Tendons, ligaments, & muscles have less lever system to pull across to effectively use or develop muscle strength for power & stamina.
 It is best to match the horse with a petite & lean rider. It is best to use the horse for pleasure, trail, driving, non-impact sports, and non-speed work.

Coarse-Boned/Sturdy-Framed 
 Overall bones are larger, wider, & stronger in a horse with either light or bulky muscled appearance.
 Advantageous for any sport, the horse tends to hold up well.
 The horses tend to be rugged and durable, capable of carrying large weights relative to size.
 Big, solid bones provide strong levers for the muscles to pull against to improve efficiency of motion, thus minimizing the effort of exercise & reduces the likelihood of fatigue, contributing to endurance. May add mass to each leg, and consequently slightly hinder speed.

Withers Higher than Croup 
 The peak of the withers is higher than the peak of the croup when the horse is square.
 This is commonly but incorrectly referred to as built uphill. True uphill build refers to the spine and is very advantageous in dressage, eventing, etc. as the horse has an easier time engaging the hind end. High withers give the false visual of an uphill build.
 Many breeds characteristically have high and prominent withers, such as the TB. In these horses the withers may be higher than the croup giving the impression of an uphill build while the horse's actual spine levelness is downhill.
 Common in well-built warmbloods.

Withers Lower than Croup/Rump High/Downhill Balance 
 The peak of the croup is higher than the peak of the withers. This is less desirable than a horse with higher withers.
 Seen in any breed but especially in Thoroughbreds, Standardbreds, and Quarter Horses.
 Young horses are usually built this way.
 More weight is placed on the forehand, reducing the front-end agility. Muscles must work harder to lift the forehand, leading to muscular fatigue. It is difficult to raise the forehand at the base of a jump for liftoff. At speed, more work of loins, back & front end is needed to lift the forelimbs.
 Increases concussion on the front legs, so the horse is at greater risk of front-end lameness.
 Tends to throw the saddle & rider toward the shoulders, leading to chafing, pressure around withers, & restricted shoulder movement.

Too Tall or Too Short (in context to rider) 

 The height of the horse is dependent on the size of its intended rider, but does not affect the overall bone structure and balance of the horse.  Each rider should be paired with a horse that is proportional to their body structure.

See also
Glossary of equestrian terms

References

Horse anatomy